Paul F. Antonelli (born July 22, 1959) is an American composer, musician, music director, and music supervisor. He began his career in the entertainment world as a keyboardist and founding member of the 1980s synthpop band, Animotion, which had evolved out of his previous band, Red Zone. Animotion would experience mainstream success with their hit single, "Obsession", written by Holly Knight and Michael Des Barres -for which a music video was filmed that prominently featured Antonelli in several scenes.

After leaving Animotion in the mid-80s, he played with the band Radio Werewolf and later appeared with them in the 1988 film Mortuary Academy. Around this time, he began composing music for various films. He has worked as a composer on 3 Chains o' Gold (1994) and The Beautiful Experience (1994) for the artist formerly and currently known as Prince, Speed Zone! (1989), The Princess Academy (1987), Dead On: Relentless II (1992), China O'Brien II (1991), China O'Brien (1990), Out of the Dark (1989) and The Women's Club (1987). He worked as a musical director or supervisor on the daytime soap operas General Hospital (1984–1985, 1991–1996), Santa Barbara (1985–1987), All My Children (1996–1998), Sunset Beach (1998–1999), Passions (2000–2008), As The World Turns (2009–2010), Days of Our Lives (2011–present), Hollywood Heights (2012) and The Young And The Restless (2013–present).

In 2014, Antonelli was the music supervisor for the soap opera web series Beacon Hill.

Awards and nominations
Daytime Emmy awards:
Nominated, 2013, Outstanding Music Direction and Composition for a Drama Series Days of Our Lives (shared with: Stephen Reinhardt (music supervisor), D. Brent Nelson (composer), Ken Corday (composer) 
Nominated, 2004, Outstanding Achievement in Music Direction and Composition for a Drama Series for: "Passions" (shared with Peter Brinkerhoff, Grant A. Johnson, James Sayegh, Karen Wilkens, Phideaux Xavier, Tina Keller, Dania L. Guthrie, Mary Ann Benson, Steven Vincent, Roy Friedland, Michael Caron, and Jay Zabriskie)
Won, 2004, Outstanding Achievement in Music Direction and Composition for a Drama Series for: "Passions" (shared with Ed O'Donnell, John Henry Kreitler, and Wes Boatman)
Nominated, 2003, Outstanding Drama Series Directing Team for: "Passions" (shared with Peter Brinkerhoff, Grant A. Johnson, James Sayegh, Karen Wilkens, Phideaux Xavier, Tina Keller, Robbin Phillips, Mary Ann Benson, Steven Vincent, Roy Friedland, Michael Caron, and Michelle Azenzer)
Nominated, 2003, Outstanding Achievement in Music Direction and Composition for a Drama Series for: "Passions" (shared with Ed O'Donnell, John Henry Kreitler, and Wesley B. Boatman Jr.)
Nominated, 2001, Outstanding Drama Series Directing Team for: "Passions" (shared with Peter Brinkerhoff, Grant A. Johnson, James Sayegh, Gary Tomlin, Karen Wilkens, Tina Keller, Robbin Phillips, Ann Rogerson, Steven Vincent, Mary Ann Benson, Bret Warren, and Roy Friedland)
Nominated, 2001, Outstanding Achievement in Music Direction and Composition for a Drama Series for: "Passions" (shared with Ed O'Donnell, John Henry Kreitler, and Wes Boatman)
Nominated, 2000, Outstanding Drama Series Directing Team for: "Sunset Beach" (shared with Peter Brinkerhoff, Grant A. Johnson, Andrew Lee, Carla Mangia Sherwood, Ian Toporoff, Tina Keller, Ray Bonassi, Deborah Komatsu, Shel Sandman, Shannon Mason, Denny Barry, Patricia Ann Dyer, Roy Friedland, and Barbara Roche)
Nominated, 1999, Outstanding Drama Series Directing Team for: "All My Children" (shared with James Baffico, Casey Childs, Conal O'Brien, Robert Scinto, Angela Tessinari, Karen Johnson, Barbara M. Simmons, Shirley Simmons, Terry Walker, Pamela Magee, A.J. Gundell, Penny Bergman, Tamara P. Grady, and Rusty Swope)
Won, 1999, Outstanding Achievement in Music Direction and Composition for a Drama Series for: "All My Children" (shared with A.J. Gundell, Pamela Magee, Dominic Messinger, Ron Goodman, Robbie Kondor, Mike Renzi, Terry Walker, and Gary Kuo)
Nominated, 1998, Outstanding Drama Series Directing Team for: "All My Children" (shared with Conal O'Brien, James A. Baffico, Robert Scinto, Casey Childs, Angela Tessinari, Karen Johnson, Barbara M. Simmons, Shirley Simmons, A.J. Gundell, Pamela Magee, Rusty Swope, Penny Bergman, and Tamara P. Grady)
Nominated, 1997, Outstanding Drama Series Directing Team for: "All My Children" (shared with Conal O'Brien, James A. Baffico, Henry Kaplan, Jill Ackles, Andrew Lee, Barbara M. Simmons, Shirley Simmons A.J. Gundell, Pamela Magee, Jim McDonald, Rusty Swope, Penny Bergman, and Tamara P. Grady)

References

External links
Official Website

Living people
American male composers
21st-century American composers
Emmy Award winners
1959 births
American male actors
21st-century American male musicians